The British Sports Journalism Awards are given annually in a number of categories. The category "Sports Writer of the Year" is part of the awards for sports writing and has been awarded since inception. Records date back to 2005.

Sports Writer of the Year Winners 

 2018: Daniel Taylor – The Guardian and Observer
 2017: Paul Hayward – The Daily Telegraph
 2016: Paul Hayward – The Telegraph
 2015: Martin Samuel – Daily Mail
 2014: Martin Samuel – Daily Mail
 2013: Martin Samuel – Daily Mail
 2012: Paul Hayward – The Telegraph
 2011: Michael Atherton – The Times
 2010: Martin Samuel – Daily Mail
 2009: Michael Atherton – The Times
 2008: Patrick Collins – The Mail on Sunday
 2007: Martin Samuel – The Times
 2006: Martin Samuel – The Times
 2005: Martin Samuel – The Times

References 

British journalism awards